Wienerwald (Central Bavarian: Weanawoid) is a Municipality in the district of Mödling in the Austrian state of Lower Austria. It is named after the forest Wienerwald.

Villages
 Ameisbühel
 Buchelbach
 Dornbach
 Festleiten
 Grub
 Gruberau
 Lindenhof
 Rohrberg
 Sittendorf
 Stangau
 Sulz im Wienerwald
 Vogelgraben
 Wöglerin

Population

Sights
 Wildegg Castle in Sittendorf

References

External links

Cities and towns in Mödling District